Leptostylus armatus is a species of longhorn beetles of the subfamily Lamiinae. It was described by Monné and Hoffmann in 1981, and is known from Brasil, Ecuador, Peru, and Bolivia.

References

Leptostylus
Beetles described in 1981